William M. Lehman (October 5, 1913 – March 16, 2005) was an American politician. He served in the United States Representative, representing Florida from 1973 until 1993.

Early life
Born in Selma, Alabama, Lehman graduated from Dallas Academy and Selma High School in 1930. He received a B.S. from the University of Alabama at Tuscaloosa in 1934 and attended Oxford University in 1965.

He was an auto dealer and a teacher at Miami Norland Junior High School in Miami, Florida, in 1963–1964, while also working as an instructor at Miami-Dade Junior College in 1965–1966.

Political career
He was a member of the Miami-Dade County School Board from 1966 to 1972, and was elected as a Democrat to the Ninety-third and to the nine succeeding Congresses, serving from January 3, 1973, to January 3, 1993. He was not a candidate for renomination to the One Hundred Third Congress in 1992. Segments of the area the seat occupied were folded into a district currently served by Debbie Wasserman Schultz. Serving as chair of the Miami-Dade county transportation subcommittee, he helped create the Metrorail and Tri-Rail systems. Other work includes the assisted creation of the trauma care center at Jackson Memorial Hospital.

Death
He died in 2005 in Miami Beach, aged 91. William Lehman Elementary School in Miami, Florida, and the William Lehman Causeway are named after him.

See also
 List of Jewish members of the United States Congress

References

External links

 

1913 births
2005 deaths
Politicians from Selma, Alabama
University of Alabama alumni
Alumni of the University of Oxford
Democratic Party members of the United States House of Representatives from Florida
Jewish members of the United States House of Representatives
20th-century American politicians
School board members in Florida
20th-century American Jews
21st-century American Jews